Nikolai Mikhailovich Ladukhin (– September 19, 1918, Moscow) was a Russian music theorist and composer.

He studied at the Moscow Conservatory in the class of music theory with S. I. Taneyev (graduated in 1886). He taught solfeggio and harmony there (later also instrumentation; professor since 1904). He is the author of a number of compositions - Symphonic Variations for a large orchestra, the musical picture "At Twilight", piano and violin pieces, romances, choirs, children's songs for one to three voices. It is of the greatest importance as a theoretician and teacher: the collections of solfeggio written by him for one to four voices are successfully used in teaching in our time. He also owns "Experience in the Practical Study of Intervals, Scales and Rhythm", "A Concise Encyclopedia of Music Theory", "A Guide to the Practical Study of Harmony" and a collection of tasks for it. 

Some of his students include A.N. Scriabin, N.K. Medtner, A.F. Gedike, A.B. Goldenweiser, and A.V. Nezhdanov.

Literature 

 Musical encyclopedia. Ch. ed. Yu. V. Keldysh . M.: Soviet encyclopedia, 1973-1982

Resources 
1860 births
1918 deaths
Russian music educators
Moscow State University alumni